Kickin' It Up is the second studio album by American country music artist John Michael Montgomery. The album was released by Atlantic Records on  January 25, 1994. On February 19 of the same year, the album reached #1 on the Billboard 200. Four songs were released from it: "I Swear," "Rope the Moon," "Be My Baby Tonight" and "If You've Got Love." Three of the singles reached No. 1 on the Billboard Hot Country Singles & Tracks chart, while "Rope the Moon" was a #4. "Be My Baby Tonight" and "I Swear" both crossed over into the Hot 100, peaking at #73 and #42, respectively. Additionally, "Kick It Up" peaked at #72 from unsolicited airplay. "I Swear" was later covered by pop group All-4-One, whose version was also a Number One hit in several countries.

Critical reception
Giving it 3.5 out of 5 stars, Brian Mansfield wrote in New Country magazine that "On Kickin' It Up...Montgomery captures the personality he has spent the last year developing on stage." He praised Montgomery's energy on "Friday at Five" and "Be My Baby Tonight" in particular.

Track listing

Production
Produced By Scott Hendricks
Engineered By Scott Hendricks, Amy Hughes, John Kunz, John Guess & Marty Williams
Mixed By Jeff Balding, Scott Hendricks & John Kunz
Mastered By Hank Williams

Personnel
As listed in the liner notes.
Bill Cuomo – synthesizer (3, 7, 9)
Stuart Duncan – fiddle (all tracks), mandolin (8) 
Paul Franklin – pedal steel guitar (all tracks)
Steve Gibson – acoustic guitar (1-3, 6, 8, 9)
Dann Huff – electric guitar (1-9), acoustic guitar (10)
John Barlow Jarvis – piano (2), Hammond B-3 organ (2, 10)
Brent Mason – electric guitar (all tracks)
John Michael Montgomery – lead vocals (all tracks)
John Wesley Ryles – background vocals (1-2, 4-6, 8-10)
Harry Stinson – background vocals (3, 7)
Billy Joe Walker Jr. – acoustic guitar (4, 5, 7, 10)
Dennis Wilson – background vocals (1-9)
Lonnie Wilson – drums (all tracks)
Glenn Worf – bass guitar (all tracks)
Reese Wynans – piano (all tracks), Hammond B-3 organ (5, 7)

Group vocals on "Kick It Up" by Harry Stinson, Dennis Wilson, Mimi Nuyens, Bruce Sulfridge, John Kunz and Mike Janas.

Charts

Weekly charts

Year-end charts

Certification

References

1994 albums
Albums produced by Scott Hendricks
Atlantic Records albums
John Michael Montgomery albums